Turó de la Peira is a neighborhood in the Nou Barris district of Barcelona, Catalonia (Spain).

Turo de la Peira
Nou Barris